Misk'a Urqu (Quechua misk'ay to stumble, urqu mountain,  also spelled Mizkha Orkho) is a mountain in the Bolivian Andes which reaches a height of approximately . It is located in the Chuquisaca Department, Oropeza Province, Yotala Municipality. Misk'a Urqu lies southeast of Chullpa Urqu. The Misk'a River (Quechua: Misk'a Mayu) originates east of the mountain. Its waters flow to the Pillku Mayu (Quechua for "red river").

References 

Mountains of Chuquisaca Department